Hergla is a small cliff-top town in north-eastern Tunisia at the Gulf of Hammamet. White houses of Hergla with often blue window and door surroundings are built in the classic style characteristic for Tunisia. Sousse is about 24 km south-east of Hergla. There is a lagoon between Hergla and its neighbour town Chott Meryem in the south-east called Halk el menzel (sickle lake).

History 
In the Roman period Hergla was named "Horrea Caelia". In the 3rd century CE it was the border town between the historic regions Byzacena with the capital Hadrumete (nowadays Sousse) and Zeugitana with the capital Carthago. The etymology of Hergla is still unclear: It might either refer to the "horreas" (i.e. store houses for trade), to the Greek god Heracles or to the word "frontier town". However, there is prove that a roman family called Caelii settled in Horrea Caelia underscoring the first theory. In the 6th century CE Byzantines built a fortification. After the Arab conquest in the 7th century CE the population was utterly killed.³  Close to the seaside there are still remainders of both roman and Byzantine foundations.

Buildings 
In the centre of the old village close to the seaside is the "Sidi Bou Mendil" mosque (built in the 18th century CE), which dominates the town. Nearby there is the cemetery of Hergla with historic tombs and the mausoleum of Sidi Bou Mendil.  Sidi Bou Mendil, stemming originally from Morocco, is said, according to local legends, having returned from a pilgrimage to Mecca on a flying handkerchief. Hergla has two other historic mosques.

Cinema
Since 2005, the African Mediterranean Cultural Association has been organizing the Hergla Film Meetings each summer. Evenings of film screenings and music concerts are given in an oil mill and training workshops, debates and exhibitions are held at the House of Culture of Hergla. Internationally renowned artists participated, such as Sotigui Kouyate, Mohammed Bakri, Nouri Bouzid, Wasis Diop and Afel Bocoum.

Economy 
Unlike  close touristic centres Hammamet and Port El Kantaoui Hergla has not much tourism. There is a little fishermen's harbour. Important products are baskets from esparto. Hotels still do not exist. Plans to build a large touristic center are stalled. Many people are employed in the touristic centers between Port el Kantaoui and Sousse. Furthermore, there is a dorade farm.

References 

Dictionary of Greek and Roman Geography

Populated places in Tunisia
Populated coastal places in Tunisia
Communes of Tunisia